Cabeça Gorda is a parish of the municipality of Beja, southeast Portugal. The population in 2011 was 1,386, in an area of 78.16 km2.

References 

Freguesias of Beja, Portugal